Queimada may refer to:

Places
 Queimada, Cape Verde, a village in the northwest-central part of São Nicolau Island
 Ilha da Queimada Grande, an island in the State of São Paulo, Brazil
 Queimada (Armamar), a civil parish in the municipality of Armamar, Portugal

Other
 Queimada (drink)
 Queimada, a Brazilian variation of dodgeball for the Prisonball ball game
 Queimada, 1969 film directed by Gillo Pontecorvo, also known as Burn!

See also 
 Queimados, a municipality in the State of Rio de Janeiro, Brazil
 Queimados River, a river in the State of Rio de Janeiro, Brazil
 Quemada, municipality in the province of Burgos, Autonomous community of Castile and León, Spain